"The People of the Summit" is a short story by Swedish writer Björn Nyberg, subsequently revised by L. Sprague de Camp, featuring the fictional sword and sorcery hero Conan the Barbarian created by Robert E. Howard. Nyberg's version of the story was first published by Lancer Books in the paperback anthology The Mighty Swordsmen in December 1970. The revised version was first published by Bantam Books in the paperback collection Conan the Swordsman in August 1978. Later paperback editions of the collection were issued by Ace Books (1987 and 1991). The first hardcover edition was published by Tor Books in 2002. The book has also been translated into Italian. It was later gathered together with Conan the Liberator and Conan and the Spider God into the omnibus collection Sagas of Conan (Tor Books, 2004).

Plot
Conan and his comrade, Jamal, are the sole survivors in a cavalry of Turanian soldiers ambushed by Khozgarian tribesmen. Fleeing the massacre, they encounter Shanya Karaz, daughter of a Khozgari chief, whom they seize as a hostage. Their journey brings the three across Bhamlar Pass, which they brave despite Shanya's warnings about the People of the Summit, remnants of a dying race who haunt the high mountains. Lost in the pass, all three are attacked simultaneously. Jamal is killed, while Shanya is captured during the struggle. After escaping a troop of grey-haired apes, Conan pursue the creatures towards an ancient tower in his quest to rescue Shanya.

Sources

1970 short stories
Conan the Barbarian stories by L. Sprague de Camp
Pulp stories
Fantasy short stories